Local elections in Mandaluyong was held on May 9, 2022 within the Philippine general election. The voters elected for the elective local posts in the city: the mayor, vice mayor, one Congressman, and the councilors, six in each of the city's two legislative districts.

Background 
Incumbents Carmelita Abalos and Anthony Suva are on their second term as Mayor and Vice Mayor of Mandaluyong, respectively; they are thus eligible for a third and final term. On September 23, 2021, Abalos had initially declared her intention to seek reelection, with Suva as her running mate. However, she gave way to her father-in-law, Benjamin Abalos Sr., and would instead run as his running mate for vice mayor. Suva would instead run for councilor from the 1st District. Abalos Sr. served as mayor from 1986 to 1987 as officer-in-charge and from 1988 to 1998. Incumbent Representative and Deputy Speaker Neptali Gonzales II ran for reelection against incumbent 2nd District Councilor Boyett Bacar.

Tickets

Administration coalition

Results

Mayoral election

Vice Mayoral election

Congressional election

Council elections

1st District 

|-bgcolor=black
|colspan=5|

2nd District 

|-bgcolor=black
|colspan=5|

References 

2022 Philippine local elections
May 2022 events in the Philippines
2022 elections in Metro Manila